The 2019 Alberta Boston Pizza Cup presented by Best Western, the provincial men's curling championship for Alberta, was held from February 6 to 10 at the Ellerslie Curling Club in Edmonton, Alberta. The winning Kevin Koe team represented Alberta at the 2019 Tim Hortons Brier in Brandon, Manitoba.

Qualification

Teams
The teams are listed as follows:

Knockout brackets
The draw is listed as follows:

A Event

B Event

C Event

Playoffs

A vs. B
February 9, 6:30pm

C1 vs. C2
February 9, 6:30pm

Semifinal
February 10, 11:00am

Final
February 10, 5:00pm

References

External links

Curling in Alberta
2019 Tim Hortons Brier
Sport in Edmonton
2019 in Alberta
Boston Pizza Cup